Trnava is a settlement in the Municipality of Braslovče in Slovenia. It lies just north of Šentrupert. The A1 motorway crosses the settlement's territory just north of the village core. The area is part of the traditional region of Styria. The municipality is now included in the Savinja Statistical Region.

A middle La Tène culture site has been partially investigated near the settlement.

References

External links 
 Trnava on Geopedia

Populated places in the Municipality of Braslovče